WildPlay Element Parks is a Canadian-owned chain of outdoor recreation parks located across British Columbia, Ontario and New York. It is based on Vancouver Island.
WildPlay's first park was opened south of Nanaimo, British Columbia in March 2006 where the company operates North America's first legal, purpose-made bungee jumping bridge. The Nanaimo location hosts naked bungee jumping once a year as a fundraiser.
Besides bungee jumping, WildPlay parks are made up of treetop activities involving high-ropes and obstacle climbing, swinging, and ziplining.
WildPlay is located in Victoria, Maple Ridge, Nanaimo, Kelowna, British Columbia, Niagara Falls, Ontario, Jones Beach State Park and John Boyd Thacher State Park in New York.

References

External links 
 Company website

Outdoor recreation
Tourist attractions in British Columbia